Polk County Courthouse is a historic courthouse located in Columbus, Polk County, North Carolina. It was built in 1859 and is a two-story, "T"-shaped, Greek Revival style brick building. The front facade features an engaged, three-bay portico with a plain pediment supported by four square pillars. Atop the roof is a three-stage cupola.

It was added to the National Register of Historic Places in 1974.

References

External links

Historic American Buildings Survey in North Carolina
County courthouses in North Carolina
Courthouses on the National Register of Historic Places in North Carolina
Greek Revival architecture in North Carolina
Government buildings completed in 1859
Buildings and structures in Polk County, North Carolina
National Register of Historic Places in Polk County, North Carolina